Asish Banerjee is an Indian politician representing All India Trinamool Congress, who was the minister in charge of the Department of Agriculture in the Government of West Bengal from 2017 to 2021.
He is also M.L.A. of West Bengal Legislative Assembly, elected from Rampurhat (Vidhan Sabha constituency) five times (terms 2001, 2006, 2011, 2016 & 2021).

Early life
Asish Banerjee was born in Rampurhat Birbhum district in West Bengal. He completed his bachelor's and master's degrees from Burdwan University. He also completed his PhD at the same university. During this period he was elected General Secretary of University Students' Council.

Career
After completing his education at Burdwan University, Banerjee was an associate professor of Bengali at Rampurhat College under Burdwan University.

MLA of Rampurhat 
He was elected as M.L.A. from Rampurhat (Vidhan Sabha constituency) in 2001 and subsequently re-elected from same constituency in 2006, 2011 and 2016. Banerjee was first time sworn in as a Minister of State under chief minister Mamata Banerjee in 2014 and allotted the independent charge of Department of Ayurveda, Yoga and Naturopathy, Unani, Siddha and Homoeopathy. The next year he was nominated for minister in charge for Department of Biotechnology, Department of Statistics and Programme implementation, Planning.

In 2017, he took charge as the Agriculture Minister of West Bengal Government in Mamata Banerjee ministry (2016–2021) from his predecessor Purnendo Bose.

References

 https://wb.gov.in/portal/web/guest/ministers
 https://web.archive.org/web/20190606083438/http://aitcofficial.org/aitc/full-list-of-ministers-and-their-portfolios-in-the-new-west-bengal-government/
 
 https://zeenews.india.com/west-bengal/small-reshuffle-in-west-bengal-government-2040130.html

External links 
West Bengal Legislative Assembly

West Bengal MLAs 2001–2006
West Bengal MLAs 2006–2011
West Bengal MLAs 2011–2016
West Bengal MLAs 2016–2021
Living people
University of Burdwan alumni
Academic staff of the University of Burdwan
1951 births
Deputy Speakers of the West Bengal Legislative Assembly